The funeral of Queen Alexandra (formerly Princess Alexandra of Denmark), widow to King Edward VII, occurred on Friday, 27 November 1925.

Death and funeral
Alexandra appeared youthful even in her senior years, but during the First World War her age caught up with her. She made no more visits to foreign countries, and her health gradually deteriorated. In 1920, a blood vessel in her eye burst, leaving her with temporary partial blindness. Towards the end of her life, her memory and speech became impaired.

A day before her death, Alexandra reportedly suffered a seizure at 11:00 am. By 1:00 pm on 20 November, members of her family, including the Queen of Norway, the Princess Royal, Princess Victoria, and Prince Henry had arrived, after which she became unconscious. By 4:15 pm she was administered oxygen but continued to lose strength. She died on 20 November 1925 at Sandringham House at 5:25 pm from a heart attack eleven days before her 81st birthday. The King and Queen and other members of the royal family were by her side. The Prince of Wales and the Duke of York who were on a train to Sandringham arrived at 6:45 pm. Flags flew at half-mast following the announcement of her death, except at Windsor Castle where the Union Jack flew high as it could only be lowered when a sovereign had died. Shows involving music and dance were cancelled by the West End hotels in London and the BBC interrupted its regular programmes. Prime Minister Stanley Baldwin brought forward a motion of condolence in the House of Commons, which was agreed to by the Leader of the Opposition Ramsay MacDonald. The Grenadier Guards marched in the Horse Guards Parade with their colours draped.

After her death, Alexandra's remains were placed at St Mary Magdalene Church, Sandringham, before being moved to the Chapel Royal in St James' Palace. A simple service was also held at the church in Sandringham, attended by members of the royal family and the villagers. Mourners also filed past the coffin. Her coffin, draped in her personal banner of arms, was taken in a procession in Sandringham to Wolferton railway station. The King and Queen, the Prince of Wales, the Duke of York, and other mourners followed the coffin, while estate employees and villagers also eventually joined in on the procession.

In London, the procession went from St James' Palace to Westminster Abbey and the whole route was lined with military personnel. Areas the coffin passed by included The Mall, Horse Guards Parade, and Whitehall. Detachments from different regiments took part in the procession as the gun carriage on which the coffin was placed made its way to abbey amid the sound of gun salutes. Walking behind the coffin were the King (in a Field Marshal's uniform), the King of the Belgians, the King of Denmark, the King of Norway, the Prince of Wales (in the uniform of a Colonel of the Welsh Guards), the Crown Prince of Norway, and other royal princes. The Queen, the Queen of Norway, the Queen of Spain, and royal princesses travelled straight to the abbey. Pallbearers were chosen from the King's Company of Grenadiers. Her funeral was held at the abbey on 27 November 1925 at 11:30 am. The funeral service was conducted by the Archbishop of Canterbury. Among the attendees were cabinet members, diplomats and high commissioners. The order of service included Psalm 23, hymns such as "Now the Laborer's Task is O'er" and "On the Resurrection Morning", and the anthem "Give Rest, O Christ".

After the funeral service, the coffin was watched by the Honourable Corps of Gentlemen at Arms and the Yeomen of the Guard, who had also stood vigil at St James' Palace. She lay in state at the abbey, where members of the public were allowed to enter and file past on 27 November to pay their respects. Additional memorial services were held at churches across the country, while theatres and dance halls were closed. In Australia, memorial services were also held at St David's Cathedral, Hobart, St Paul's Cathedral, Melbourne, and St John's Cathedral, Brisbane. On 28 November, her coffin was taken to Windsor for a private service in the evening, where it was placed together with her late husband's coffin in front of the altar in the Albert Memorial Chapel. On 29 November, members of the public visited Windsor to view the floral tributes left out for Alexandra.

After her husband Edward VII's death, his body had been temporarily interred in the Royal Vault at Windsor under the Albert Memorial Chapel. On the instructions of Alexandra in 1919, a monument in the South Aisle was designed and executed by Bertram Mackennal, featuring tomb effigies of the King and Queen in white marble mounted on a black and green marble sarcophagus, where both bodies were interred two years after Alexandra's death on 22 April 1927. The monument includes a depiction of Edward's favourite dog, Caesar, lying at his feet.

Her great-granddaughter Princess Elizabeth Alexandra Mary of York (later Queen Elizabeth II), who was born six months after Alexandra's death, was named after her.

References

Notes

Sources

External links
 Order of Service for the funeral

Alexandra of Denmark
1925 in Europe
1925 in the United Kingdom
1920s in the City of Westminster
Ceremonial funerals in the United Kingdom
European court festivities
Events involving British royalty
Alexandra, Queen
November 1925 events
Westminster Abbey